The Lo Nuestro Award for Video of the Year is an honor presented annually by American television network Univision at the Lo Nuestro Awards. The accolade was established to recognize the most talented performers of Latin music. The nominees and winners were originally selected by a voting poll conducted among program directors of Spanish-language radio stations in the United States and also based on chart performance on Billboard Latin music charts, with the results being tabulated and certified by the accounting firm Deloitte. However, since 2004, the winners are selected through an online survey. The trophy awarded is shaped in the form of a treble clef.

The award was first presented to "A Pedir Su Mano" by Dominican singer Juan Luis Guerra in 1991. Puerto-Rican American singer Ricky Martin and Spanish artist Enrique Iglesias are the most awarded performers, with four victories for Martin, for "Te Extraño, Te Olvido, Te Amo", "Bella", "She Bangs" and "La Mordidita" and Iglesias with three victories, "Esperanza", "Héroe" and "Bailando"; Martin also won the Latin Grammy Award for Best Short Form Music Video for "She Bangs". Iglesias' "Héroe" won the Lo Nuestro and also was nominated for Video of the Year in the MTV Video Music Awards Latinoamérica of 2002 and the English-language version of the video was a four-time nominee in the 2002 MTV Video Music Awards including Viewer's Choice and Best Male Video. Two-time winners include Puerto-Rican reggaeton performer Daddy Yankee and Colombian artist Juanes. Mexican band Maná and Spanish singer-songwriter Alejandro Sanz are the most nominated artists without a win, with seven unsuccessful nominations each.

Winners and nominees
Listed below are the winners of the award for each year, as well as the other nominees.

See also
 Latin Grammy Award for Best Short Form Music Video
 Los Premios MTV Latinoamérica for Video of the Year

References

Video
American music video awards
Awards established in 1991
1991 establishments in the United States